GLR may refer to:

 Central Mountain Air, a Canadian airline
 Gartell Light Railway, in England
 Gaylord Regional Airport, in Michigan
 Glaro-Twabo language
 Glória Station, of the Rio de Janeiro Metro
 Gloucester Road tube station, London, London Underground station code
 George Lincoln Rockwell, of the American Nazi Party
Green Label Relaxing, a sub-label of the Japanese clothing brand United Arrows
 GLRA2, a protein
 GLR parser
 Glycine receptor
 Greater London Radio, now BBC Radio London
 Grupo Latino de Radio, an American radio network
 Gwalior Light Railway, in India